Rafael Schuler Crivellaro (born 18 February 1989) is a Brazilian professional footballer who plays as an attacking midfielder for Jamshedpur in the Indian Super League.

Career
Born in Porto Alegre, Crivellaro youth development was spent at Internacional and Empoli. In 2009, he joined, Sociedade Esportiva e Recreativa Caxias do Sul competing in the third tier. From there, he moved to Guaratinguetá making his professional debut on 19 October 2010 in a match against Icasa.

Crivellaro joined Vitória Guimarães in January 2011, being loaned to Trofense for the 2011-12 season on 26 August 2011. The following year, he returned to Guimarães, competing in their first team, but also having short stints in their reserve-side, winning an award in November 2014 for SJPF Segunda Liga Player of the Month.

On 28 January 2015, Crivellaro move to the Ajman Club, at the time, managed by Manuel Cajuda. Not even six months later, on 24 June 2015, he moved to Poland, joining 
Wisła Kraków.

Crivellaro joined Primeira Liga club Arouca on a two-year contract on 17 June 2016.

On 3 September 2019, Crivellaro penned a deal with Chennaiyin as their latest foreign recruit. Crivellaro was appointed as captain of Chennaiyin FC in November 2020 ahead of the 2020–21 Indian Super League season. Later he was ruled out of the rest of the season due to an ankle injury. On 16 July 2021, Chennayin FC announced that they have extended the contract of Crivellaro on a multi year deal.

On 7 December 2022, Crivellaro joined Indian Super League rivals Jamshedpur on a contract until the end of the 2022–23 season.

Honours
Vitória de Guimarães
Taça de Portugal: 2012–13
 Chennaiyin FC
 Runners-up : 2019–20

Personal
SJPF Segunda Liga Player of the Month: November 2014

References

External links
 
 
 
 Super League Profile

1989 births
Living people
Footballers from Porto Alegre
Brazilian footballers
Association football midfielders
Sociedade Esportiva e Recreativa Caxias do Sul players
Vitória S.C. players
C.D. Trofense players
Ajman Club players
Wisła Kraków players
F.C. Arouca players
C.D. Feirense players
Ekstraklasa players
Liga Portugal 2 players
Chennaiyin FC players
Primeira Liga players
UAE Pro League players
Brazilian expatriate footballers
Brazilian expatriate sportspeople in Portugal
Expatriate footballers in Portugal
Expatriate footballers in Poland
Brazilian expatriate sportspeople in Poland
Brazilian expatriate sportspeople in the United Arab Emirates
Expatriate footballers in the United Arab Emirates
Brazilian expatriate sportspeople in India
Indian Super League players